Tracuateua is a municipality in the state of Pará in the Northern region of Brazil.

The municipality contains the larger part of the  Tracuateua Marine Extractive Reserve, a sustainable use conservation unit created in 2005.

Climate
The climate is tropical monsoon (Köppen: Am), with great differences in precipitation according to the seasons.

See also
List of municipalities in Pará

References

Municipalities in Pará
Populated coastal places in Pará